Aglio (Italian for "garlic") is a surname. People with this surname include:

 Andrea-Salvatore Aglio (1736–1786), Italian painter and sculptor
 Agostino Aglio (1777–1857), Italian painter
 Domenico Aglio (active 1710), Italian sculptor

See also 
 Allio – similar surname

References 

Italian-language surnames